Arun Sadhu (Devanagari: अरुण साधु) (17 June 1941 – 25 September 2017) was a writer and a freelance journalist from Maharashtra, India. He has written in Marathi, Hindi, and English. He is better known for his novel "Simhasan" and "Mumbai Dinank".

Early life
He was born and brought up in Achalpur (twin town of Paratwada) in Amravati District of Vidarbha region in Maharashtra.

Career
In his earlier career, Sadhu worked in different capacities on the staff of a few national English newspapers and then served for six years as a professor and the head of the Department of Communication and Journalism at Pune University. As a political reporter, he started his journalistic career at Marathi daily ‘Kesri’ in Pune in the 1960s. In his three-decade- long journalistic career, he worked for the Statesman, The Times of India, The Indian Express and the Free Press Journal in Mumbai and was a stronger for Time magazine.

Sadhu has won several awards for his literary work. He presided over Marathi Sahitya Sammelan at Nagpur in 2007. He depicted through his writings on China, Russia to a story on a small boot polish boy in city. His writings give insight on international, national affairs.

He has also worked as a script writer in some films. He was a co-script writer of the movie Dr. Babasaheb Ambedkar (2000) along with Sooni Taraporevala and Daya Pawar.

2008 Sammelan
Sadhu, the outgoing president of 2008 Marathi Sahitya Sammelan held in Sangli left its inaugural function, protesting that Marathi writers who were sitting on the Sammelan platform along with some politicians were being "overshadowed" by the politicians by way of curtailment of time slots in the inaugural schedule for the writers on the platform through presidential protocol.

Authorship
Sadhu has written several novels, collections of his short stories, and a few books on contemporary history as well as written editorials opposing violence. The following is a partial list of his books.

 Maharashtra
 Kakasaheb Gadgil (In English and Hindi)
 Fidel, Che Ani Kranti
 Dragon Jaga Jhalyawar
 Mukhawata
 Simhasan
 Mumbai Dinank (1973) (and also its Hindi version Bambai Dinank)
 Padgam (a play) (1988)
 Shodhyatra
 Sphot
 Bahishkrut
 Trishanku
 Glanirbhavati Bharat (short stories)
 Tisari Kranti
The script of the movie Simhasan, which was made in the 1970s, was adapted from  Sadhu's novels Mumbai Dinank and Simhasan.

Along with Sooni Taraporevala and Daya Pawar, Sadhu was a co-script writer of the movie Dr. Babasaheb Ambedkar (2000).

Awards
 Sahitya Akademi award
 Bharatiya Bhasha Parishad award 
 N C Kelkaraward
 Acharya Atre awards
 Janasthan awards
 Rachna award

Death
Arun Sadhu died on Monday at 4 am in Mumbai on 25th September 2017. He was admitted to Sion Hospital, where he was suffering from cardiomyopathy. On his death, Maharashtra Chief Minister Devendra Fadnavis said, “Arun Sadhu’s novel Sinhasan and Mumbai Dinank are landmark in Marathi literature. He wrote on contemporary issues, problems of metropolitan life very effectively. He guided generations of journalists. His demise is sad. I offer my deep condolences and share the sorrow of his family and friends,”

References

Arun Sadhu : vyakti ani wangmayadarshan, Ph.D. Thesis by Dr. Rahul Hande, Sangmner

1941 births
2017 deaths
International Writing Program alumni
Marathi-language writers
Marathi people
People from Maharashtra
Presidents of the Akhil Bharatiya Marathi Sahitya Sammelan
Deaths from cardiomyopathy